The Allen Tire Company and Gas Station is an historic former automotive service facility at 228 1st Street SW (United States Route 67) in Prescott, Arkansas.  It is a single-story Craftsman style structure that was built in 1924.  Its main architectural features are a variety of arches, which flank the ends and street face of the carport, as well as the doorway into the office.  Additional Craftsman features include exposed rafter ends and three-over-one windows.  The building acted as a service station into the 1940s, and has seen a variety of other commercial and retail uses since then.

The property was listed on the National Register of Historic Places in 2001, and was delisted in 2019.

See also
National Register of Historic Places listings in Nevada County, Arkansas

References

Gas stations on the National Register of Historic Places in Arkansas
Commercial buildings completed in 1924
National Register of Historic Places in Nevada County, Arkansas
Former National Register of Historic Places in Arkansas
1924 establishments in Arkansas
Former buildings and structures in Arkansas
American Craftsman architecture in Arkansas
Bungalow architecture in Arkansas
Transportation in Nevada County, Arkansas
Prescott, Arkansas